Cook v. Gralike, 531 U.S. 510 (2001), was a United States Supreme Court case in which the Court held that an attempt by the state of Missouri to influence Congressional elections in favor of candidates who supported term limits was unconstitutional.

Opinion of the Court 

Missouri had adopted a state constitutional amendment with a change that, during primary general elections, warnings would be affixed to the voting ballots of candidates that did not support term limits.

The Court held that the powers delegated to the states by the Elections Clause related only to the power over the procedural mechanisms of elections.  Because this amendment sought to influence the outcome of elections, it exceeded state powers over national elections.

See also 
 U.S. Term Limits, Inc. v. Thornton (1995)

References

External links
 

United States Supreme Court cases
United States Supreme Court cases of the Rehnquist Court
2001 in United States case law
United States elections case law